Kick in Iran is a feature documentary by Fatima Geza Abdollahyan. It portrays Taekwondo fighter Sara Khoshjamal-Fekri on her way to the Olympic Games 2008, in Beijing. Sara Khoshjamal Fekri is the first female athlete from Iran to ever qualify directly for the Olympic Games.

Synopsis 
The movie follows Sara Khoshjamal-Fekri and her coach Maryam Azarmehr during a nine-month period, beginning with qualification and including participation in the Olympic Games 2008. Because they live in a Muslim country, the two athletes have to face a lot of challenges. They work hard as they prepare to represent the Islamic Republic of Iran as female Taekwondo-fighters.

Kick in Iran portrays day-to-day life in the Iran for two women while wearing both the hijab and the dobok.

Festivals  
Sundance Film Festival 2010 (world premiere), USA
True/False Film Festival, USA
Dallas International Filmfestival, USA
Visions du Reel, Switzerland
International Aljazeera Dokumentary Film Festival, Qatar
Filmfest Munich, Germany
Warsaw Film Festival, Poland
Mumbai Film Festival, India
Cine//B Film Festival, Chile
Corona Cork Filmfest, Ireland
International Images Film Festival for Women, Zimbabwe
Belgrade Documentary and Short Film Festival, Serbia
BAFICI, Argentina
Chennai International Film Festival, India
Noor Iranian Film Festival, USA
Film Festival for Women’s Rights, FIWOM, South Korea

Awards 
Gerd Ruge Award, Germany
Special mentions, 13th BAFICI, UNICEF AWARD
Special mentions, 26th Warsaw Filmfestival
Nominated for the Grand Jury Award of the Sundance Filmfestival 2010

References

External links

Official website
Trailer, YouTube

Documentary films about sportspeople
2010 films
German documentary films
2010 documentary films
German sports films
2010s German films